Palace of Art may refer to:

 Hall of Art, Budapest, also called Palace of Art
 Palace of Arts, former name of Müpa Budapest, a building in Ferencváros, Budapest, Hungary
 The Palace of Art, a poem by Alfred Lord Tennyson